The seventh season of The Bachelorette Australia premiered on Wednesday, 20 October 2021. In a world first, the season features Brooke Blurton, a 26 year old social worker from Melbourne, Victoria, who is the first bisexual Bachelorette in The Bachelor franchise history, courting 10 men and 10 women. She is also Australia's first Indigenous lead. Brooke previously appeared on the sixth season of The Bachelor Australia, where she finished in third place; and the second season of Bachelor in Paradise Australia.

Contestants
The first four contestants, Jamie-Lee, Darvid, Holly and Konrad, were revealed on social media prior to the full cast being revealed. Jamie-Lee was previously a contestant with Brooke in season 6 of The Bachelor. The season began with 16 contestants, who were revealed on 18 October 2021. In episode 4, Jessica, Luca, Millie and Will entered the competition as intruders, bringing the total number of contestants to 20.

Call-Out Order

Colour Key

	
 The contestant received the first impression rose, granting them the first single date.
 The contestant received a rose during a date.
 The contestant received a rose outside of a date or the rose ceremony.
 The contestant was unable to attend the rose ceremony, but received a rose.
 The contestant was eliminated outside the rose ceremony.
 The contestant was eliminated.
 The contestant quit the competition.
 The contestant won the competition.

Notes

Episodes

Episode 1
Original airdate: 20 October 2021

Episode 2
Original airdate: 21 October 2021

Episode 3
Original airdate: 27 October 2021

Episode 4
Original airdate: 28 October 2021

Episode 5
Original airdate: 3 November 2021

Episode 6
Original airdate: 4 November 2021

Episode 7
Original airdate: 10 November 2021

Episode 8
Original airdate: 17 November 2021

Episode 9
Original airdate: 18 November 2021

Episode 10
Original airdate: 18 November 2021

Episode 11
Original airdate: 24 November 2021

Episode 12
Original airdate: 25 November 2021

Ratings

References

2021 Australian television seasons
Australian (season 07)
Television shows filmed in Australia